The Free People's State of Württemberg was a state in Württemberg, Germany, during the Weimar Republic and Nazi Germany.

1918 revolution 
With the German revolution near the end of World War I, the Kingdom of Württemberg was transformed from a monarchy to a democratic republic without bloodshed; its borders and internal administration remained unchanged. King William II of Württemberg abdicated on 30 November 1918. Following the introduction of a new constitution (significantly amended later in the year) by an assembly elected in January, and the Weimar Constitution in 1919, Württemberg was re-established as a member state of the German Reich.

In comparison to the political turmoil that plagued Weimar Germany, political development in Württemberg was driven by continuity and stability. The attempt of some agitators to cause disturbances by a general strike was frustrated by the action of railway officials in paralysing communications with the capital, Stuttgart. The Bavarian Communist insurrection produced no effect in Württemberg; it was, on the contrary, suppressed with the aid of Württemberg troops before it could spread across the border.

The three legislative periods of the Württemberg parliament from 1920 to 1932 each ran the full prescribed length of four years, unlike at the 1919-1933 Chancellors of Germany at the federal level. The social democrats lost their influence in Württemberg early in the state's history, with conservative coalitions forming government from 1924 to 1933. Despite the many financial crises that affected Germany during the 1920s and 1930s, the economic development of Württemberg proceeded better than in many other German states and Stuttgart became a regional centre of finance and culture.

1933–1952 
With the Nazi seizure of federal power in 1933 they embarked on a process Gleichschaltung (coordination), the elimination of all non-Nazi organisations. Württemberg, along with all other German states, had its Landtag abolished and its state sovereignty transferred to the Reich government by the "Law on the Reconstruction of the Reich" of 30 January 1934. Though the state itself was not formally abolished, it was superseded in administrative importance by the Nazi Party Gau Württemberg-Hohenzollern. 

After World War II, Württemberg was split between the US and French Allied Occupation Zones in Germany and became parts of two new states: Württemberg-Baden in the northern American zone, and a smaller Württemberg-Hohenzollern in the southern French zone. In 1952, these two states were merged with South Baden (also in the French zone) to form the modern German state of Baden-Württemberg.

The former Free People's State coat of arms was used by the Porsche family as inspiration to create the logo of Porsche company.

See also 
 List of ministers-president of Baden-Württemberg
 List of presidents of the Landtag of the Free People's State of Württemberg
 Württemberg Landtag elections in the Weimar Republic

References 

Free People's State of Wurttemberg
States of the Weimar Republic
20th century in Württemberg